The 2018 MTV Video Music Awards Japan was held in Tokyo on October 10, 2018.

Main Awards

Best Video of the Year
Kenshi Yonezu — "Lemon"

Best Male Video
Japan
Kenshi Yonezu — "Lemon"
| International
Shawn Mendes — "In My Blood"

SAS Lifetime Achievement Award Japan
Southern All Stars

Best Female Video
Japan
aiko — "Straw"
| International
Ariana Grande — "No Tears Left to Cry"

Best Group Video
Japan
Keyakizaka46 — "Ambivalent"
| International
BTS  — "Fake Love"

Best New Artist Video
Japan
Official Hige Dandism – "No Doubt"
| International
Marshmello and Anne Marie – "Friends"

Best Rock Video
Wanima – Human

Best Alternative Video
Dean Fujioka – Echo

Best Pop Video
Gen Hoshino – Idea

Best Hip Hop Video
Sky-Hi – Marble

Best Dance Video
Blackpink – Ddu-Du Ddu-Du

Best Art Direction Video
Gen Hoshino – Idea

Best Cinematography
Little Glee Monster – Sekai wa Anata ni Waraikakete Iru

Best Choreography
E-girls – Show Time

Special awards

Artist of the Year
 Daichi Miura

Best Album of the Year
 Hikaru Utada

Legend Award
 Queen

References

2018 in Japanese music
2018 music awards